Bart Vandepoel (born 30 March 1982) is a retired Belgian footballer who finished his career with Herk-de-Stad FC.

References

External links

1982 births
Living people
Belgian footballers
Standard Liège players
K.V. Mechelen players
Association football defenders